The Apostolic Prefecture of Zhaotong is an Apostolic Prefecture (Latin pre-diocesan missionary jurisdiction, not entitled to a titular bishop), of the Catholic Church with seat in the city of Zhaotong, in the southwestern Chinese province of Yunnan.

It is exempt, i.e. directly dependent o the Holy see (and notably its missionary Roman Congregation for the Evangelization of Peoples), not part of any ecclesiastical province.

It is vacant since 1982, even without an apostolic administrator since 2012.

History 
It was established on 8 April 1935 as Apostolic Prefecture of Zhaotong 昭通 (中文) / Chaotung / Chaotungen(sis) (Latin), on territory split off from the Apostolic Vicariate of Yunnanfu 雲南府).

In 2000, the Vatican appointed  as the Apostolic Administrator of Zhaotong. He served in that position until his death in February 2012. Since then, it is without Superior.

Ordinaries 
(all Roman Rite, mostly Chinese)

Apostolic Prefects of Zhaotong 昭通  
 Father Damian Chen Da-ming (陳達明) (1935.04.08 – retired 1939), died 1945 
 Apostolic Administrator Joseph Kerec (紀勵志), Salesians (S.D.B.) (1939–1951), no other prelature
 Fr. Stephan Fan Kai-ping (范介平) (1951.07.06 – retired 1982)
 Chen Mu-shun (陳慕舜) (1988 – death 1997.04.09), without papal mandate; no other prelature
Apostolic Administrator Father Lawrence Zhang Wen-Chang (張文昌) (2000 – death 2012.02.05), also Apostolic Administrator of the Roman Catholic Archdiocese of Kunming (where he resided) and of the Roman Catholic Diocese of Dali.

See also 

 List of Catholic dioceses in China

References

External links 
 GCatholic with Google map
 Catholic Hierarchy: Apostolic Prefecture of Zhaotong [Chaotung] 

Zhaotong
Zhaotong
Christian organizations established in 1935
Christianity in Yunnan
Zhaotong
Zhaotong